Cerconota is a genus of moths in the family Depressariidae. In 1991, I. W. B. Nye and David Stephen Fletcher included it in the family Oecophoridae and the subfamily Stenomatinae. It was later placed in the family Elachistidae and subfamily Stenomatinae by Ronald W. Hodges, in Niels Peder Kristensen (1999). Other classifications placed them in the Elachistidae or Oecophoridae, but they actually seem to belong to the Depressariidae.

Species
Cerconota acajuti Becker, 1971
Cerconota achatina (Zeller, 1855)
Cerconota agraria (Meyrick, 1925)
Cerconota anonella (Sepp, 1855)
Cerconota aphanes (Walsingham, 1912)
Cerconota armiferella (Walker, 1864)
Cerconota atricassis (Meyrick, 1916)
Cerconota bathyphaea (Meyrick, 1932)
Cerconota brachyplaca (Meyrick, 1926)
Cerconota capnosphaera (Meyrick, 1916)
Cerconota carbonifer (Busck, 1914)
Cerconota censoria (Meyrick, 1915)
Cerconota certiorata (Meyrick, 1932)
Cerconota congressella (Walker, 1864)
Cerconota consobrina (Meyrick, 1915)
Cerconota dimorpha Duckworth, 1962
Cerconota dryoscia (Meyrick, 1932)
Cerconota ebenocista (Meyrick, 1928)
Cerconota emma (Busck, 1911)
Cerconota eriacma (Meyrick, 1915)
Cerconota fermentata (Meyrick, 1916)
Cerconota figularis (Meyrick, 1918)
Cerconota flexibilis (Meyrick, 1916)
Cerconota fulminata (Meyrick, 1916)
Cerconota fusigera (Meyrick, 1915)
Cerconota hexascia (Meyrick, 1925)
Cerconota horometra (Meyrick, 1925)
Cerconota hydrelaeas (Meyrick, 1931)
Cerconota impressella (Walker, 1864)
Cerconota inturbatella (Walker, 1864)
Cerconota ischnoscia (Meyrick, 1932)
Cerconota languescens (Meyrick, 1915)
Cerconota lutulenta (Zeller, 1877)
Cerconota lysalges (Walsingham, 1913)
Cerconota machinatrix (Meyrick, 1925)
Cerconota melema (Walsingham, 1913)
Cerconota minna (Busck, 1914)
Cerconota miseta (Walsingham, 1913)
Cerconota myrodora (Meyrick, 1925)
Cerconota nimbosa (Zeller, 1877)
Cerconota nitens (Butler, 1877)
Cerconota noverca (Meyrick, 1916)
Cerconota nymphas (Meyrick, 1916)
Cerconota obsordescens (Meyrick, 1930)
Cerconota oceanitis (Meyrick, 1916)
Cerconota palliata (Walsingham, 1913)
Cerconota phaeophanes (Meyrick, 1912)
Cerconota ptilosema Meyrick, 1918
Cerconota recurrens (Meyrick, 1925)
Cerconota recurvella (Walker, 1864)
Cerconota robiginosa (Meyrick, 1925)
Cerconota rosacea (Butler, 1877)
Cerconota sciaphilina (Zeller, 1877)
Cerconota scolopacina (Walsingham, 1913)
Cerconota seducta (Meyrick, 1918)
Cerconota siraphora (Meyrick, 1915)
Cerconota sphragidopis (Meyrick, 1915)
Cerconota stylonota (Meyrick, 1915)
Cerconota tabida (Butler, 1877)
Cerconota tholodes (Meyrick, 1915)
Cerconota tinctipennis (Butler, 1877)
Cerconota tricharacta (Meyrick, 1925)
Cerconota trichoneura (Meyrick, 1913)
Cerconota tridesma Meyrick, 1915
Cerconota trizeucta (Meyrick, 1930)
Cerconota trochistis (Meyrick, 1916)
Cerconota trymalopa (Meyrick, 1925)
Cerconota tumulata (Meyrick, 1916)

References

 
Stenomatinae
Moth genera
Taxa named by Edward Meyrick